The sixth season of The Great Australian Bake Off premiered on 27 January 2022 on the Lifestyle channel.

Production
In December 2020, there was speculation the series was to be picked up by the Seven Network after the previous 4 seasons were aired on Foxtel's Lifestyle channels, however in March 2021, Foxtel was in “advanced discussions” for a series return. In June 2021, it was officially renewed by Foxtel with auditions open from June to 18 July 2021, with BBC Studios Australia taking over production from Fremantle Australia.

The Bakers
The following is the list of the bakers that are competing this season:

{| class="wikitable" style="text-align:center"
|-
! style="background:skyblue" "color:black;"| Baker
! style="background:skyblue" "color:black;"| Age 
! style="background:skyblue" "color:black;"| Occupation 
! style="background:skyblue" "color:black;"| Competition Status
|-
| Ella Rossanis
| 35
| Creative Copywriter
| style="background:gold"| Season Winner
|-
| Aaron Hawton
| 31 
| High School Teacher
| style="background:limegreen"| Season Runner-Up
|-
| Nurman Noor
| 35
| General Practitioner
| style="background:limegreen"| Season Runner-Up
|-
| Hoda Alzubaidi
| 28
| Publishing Sales
| style="background:tomato"| Eliminated (Episode 9)
|-
| Jawin Ratchawong
| 27
| Public Servant
| style="background:tomato"| Eliminated (Episode 8)
|-
| Carmel Scassa
| 48
| Document Controller
| style="background:tomato"| Eliminated (Episode 7)
|-
| Haydn Allbutt
| 46
| Scientist & Stay-at-home Dad
| style="background:tomato"| Eliminated (Episode 6)
|-
| Ashley Callaghan
| 30
| Retired Navy Veteran 
| style="background:Orange"| Left (Episode 5)
|-
| Naveid ‘Nav’ Zarshoy
| 32
| Recruitment Consultant 
| style="background:tomato"| Eliminated (Episode 4)
|-
| Blessing Mudzikitiri
| 19
| Disability Support Worker
| style="background:tomato"| Eliminated (Episode 3)
|-
| Tom Mosby
| 52
| CEO
| style="background:tomato"| Eliminated (Episode 2)
|-
| Lidia Morosin
| 62
| Retail Sales
| style="background:tomato"| Eliminated (Episode 1)
|}

Results summary

Colour key:

Episodes

Episode 1: Cake Week

Episode 2: Biscuit Week

Episode 3: Bread Week

Episode 4: Nostalgia Week

Episode 5: Homegrown Week

Episode 6: French Week

Episode 7: Dessert Week

Episode 8: Fruit & Veg Week

Episode 9: Patisserie Week

Episode 10: Finale

Ratings

References

6
2022 Australian television seasons